Blue Door Pub is a chain of restaurants in Minneapolis and Saint Paul, Minnesota, that has 5 locations, including one at the Minneapolis–Saint Paul International Airport. It is known for the Blucy, a variant of the Jucy Lucy. The Blue Door has been featured on Food Paradise, Man v. Food, and Diners, Drive-Ins and Dives.

Jeremy Woerner and Pat McDonough opened the first Blue Door Pub in September 2008. The other four locations opened over the next ten years, with the most recent at the airport.

The original Blue Door Pub was located in St. Paul, but closed and did not re-open amidst the covid-19 pandemic.

External links

References

Restaurants in Minnesota
2008 establishments in Minnesota
Companies based in Minneapolis